Frankfort Square is a census-designated place (CDP) in Will County, Illinois, United States. Per the 2020 census, the population was 8,968.

Geography

It is bordered by Frankfort to the south, Tinley Park to the north and Matteson (in Cook County) to the east.

Demographics

2020 census

Note: the US Census treats Hispanic/Latino as an ethnic category. This table excludes Latinos from the racial categories and assigns them to a separate category. Hispanics/Latinos can be of any race.

2000 Census
As of the census of 2000, there were 7,766 people, 2,363 households, and 2,018 families living in the CDP. The racial makeup of the CDP was 94.84% White, 1.27% African American, 0.05% Native American, 1.74% Asian, 1.21% from other races, and 0.89% from two or more races. Hispanic or Latino of any race were 4.02% of the population.

There were 2,363 households, out of which 57.7% had children under the age of 18 living with them, 73.5% were married couples living together, 8.6% had a female householder with no husband present, and 14.6% were non-families. 11.8% of all households were made up of individuals, and 1.4% had someone living alone who was 65 years of age or older. The average household size was 3.29 and the average family size was 3.60.

In the CDP, the population was spread out, with 36.1% under the age of 18, 7.0% from 18 to 24, 37.0% from 25 to 44, 17.6% from 45 to 64, and 2.3% who were 65 years of age or older. The median age was 31 years. For every 100 females, there were 97.8 males. For every 100 females age 18 and over, there were 96.9 males.

The average income for a household in the CDP is $69,459, and the median income for a family was $72,689. Males had a median income of $50,171 versus $30,750 for females. The per capita income for the CDP was $22,038. About 2.3% of families and 2.4% of the population were below the poverty line, including 3.2% of those under age 18 and 12.1% of those age 65 or over.

See also
Frankfort Square Park District

References

Census-designated places in Illinois
Census-designated places in Will County, Illinois